Americhem, Inc. is a global masterbatch manufacturer that specializes in custom color and additive masterbatches, with its global headquarters in Cuyahoga Falls, Ohio. The company manufactures a diverse range of single pigment dispersions, color and additive concentrates and custom compounds. A sister company, Infinity LTL Engineered Compounds, manufactures custom compounded engineered thermoplastics, and has locations in Swedesboro, New Jersey, and Morrisville, Pennsylvania. Vi-Chem, acquired in 2016, is a producer of PVC and elastomeric compounds.

Founded in Ohio in 1941, Americhem employs over 500 people worldwide. It has ten manufacturing sites in North America, Europe, and Asia that provide service to customers in over 50 countries worldwide with products for the plastics and synthetic fibers industries.

History 

On November 29, 1941, Alabama native Sylvester S. Caldwell founded The Caldwell Company in Akron, OH. The company started as a manufacturer’s representative with Thompson Weinman & Co., a manufacturer in the rubber industry, as the first and principal client.

During World War II natural rubber became scarce due to rationing. The Caldwell Co. took on more clients to keep profits up including Harmon Color; this marked the company’s first experience with colorant. In September 1943 Caldwell Co. became incorporated, which was followed by fast growth and new customers. Due to the growth, the company was relocated to its own building on Cutler Parkway while remaining in Akron, Ohio.

Richard H. Juve joined the company in June 1953 and introduced a line of stabilizing products to push sales in the rubber industry. He was followed by Harvey E. Cooper who joined in 1958 as a chemist from Firestone Tire and Rubber Company. Both men acquired equal shares of The Caldwell Company, making them president and vice president of the company. 
	
On September 2, 1959, the first manufacturing plant was opened on Home Ave. in Akron, OH. This was the beginning of The Caldwell Co. manufacturing its own products. With the change in business operations, The Caldwell Co. quickly changed their name to Americhem Inc. The newly named company began regularly producing their own products in 1960. With funding from the issuance of bonds, Americhem was able to develop a number of new commercial products. By the end of 1964, Americhem was manufacturing color concentrates for ABS, many of which were used for the RV industry. In July 1965, Americhem Headquarters was moved to a new building in Cuyahoga Falls, Ohio. There was also an expansion with manufacturing in 1969 when a new plant was purchased in Medina, OH. Also in 1969, Americhem designed and manufactured the first masterbatches for vinyl siding. This marked the company’s first step into the building products industry. Americhem then became a member of the Vinyl Siding Institute and helped invent tests along with standards for weathering and durability that are still used today.
	
Americhem was one of the first companies to use IBM System/3 computers and ACS Color Matching computers that were installed in 1972. Then in 1973, they opened their first out of state plant located in Elgin, Illinois. This plant eventually became the new location of the Medina, OH plant. The 1973 oil crisis devastated the automotive industry, which in turn severely affected sales at Americhem. During this time, Americhem gained business in the packaging and construction industries, which led to an upturn in profits. In 1974, partial owner Harvey Cooper retired, leaving ownership of Americhem Inc. to Richard Juve who became majority owner.  
	
In 1978, Americhem reached a milestone when opening their first research department. The new laboratory led to the production of Americhem’s first color concentrates for synthetic fibers in response to the new developments of nylon and polyester dispersion technology. In 1987, Americhem received “Best Technical Paper” for the presentation “Weathering Metamerism: A Photochemical Process” and again in 1988 for “Refractive Index: A Key to Understanding Color Difference.” Around the same time, Americhem purchased Colourfast Plastics Ltd. in England to expand their international presence. Then, in order to be strategically located in the heart of the textile industry, Americhem opened a plant in Concord, North Carolina, in 1989. Americhem opened a new plant on Steels Corners Road in Cuyahoga Falls, OH in 1998”
 
In 2001, Americhem introduced a polyester solution dye product line for automotive interiors which still continues to be an excellent market that the company excels in. A plant was opened in 2002 located in the carpet capital of the world, Dalton, Georgia. Americhem continued to expand internationally with the establishment of the Luxembourg sales office in 2003, the Mexico City sales office in 2004, and the Suzhou, China plant that opened in 2006 and was expanded in 2014.  In the early 2000s, Americhem introduced the first variegated wood grain products for composite deck board applications in 2005, an outdoor color line for polyester fibers, and a low heat build-up technology for dark construction colors in 2006.In 2007, a new company logo and brand were introduced to the market. This included a reimagining of the traditional logo and new company colors: navy blue and sage green.

2009 saw a push for more eco-friendly practices. Americhem implemented lighting improvements to improve energy efficiency, reduce greenhouse gas emissions, and reduce the company’s carbon footprint. All plants and offices started participating in recycling programs and all plants switched from using carbon dioxide to liquid nitrogen as a coolant. The seventh Americhem plant was opened in 2010 in Liberty, NC with a specialty of black, white and additive masterbatch products. In 2011, Americhem Inc. celebrated their 70-year anniversary, which was recognized by the governor of Ohio and mayor of Cuyahoga Falls. Americhem will celebrate its 75-year anniversary on November 29, 2016.

The Queen’s Award for Enterprise was awarded to Americhem for the second time in the category of International Trade in 2012. Americhem also won the Material of the Year award from Material Connexion in NYC for their photochromatic "blushing bottles." Americhem U, a series of informational seminars for customers, was introduced in 2011 and continues to this day.

On December 28, 2012, Americhem Inc. purchased Infinity Compounding in Swedesboro, NJ later changing their name to Americhem Infinity Engineered Compounds. In 2014, the Americhem Manchester, U.K. factory was granted ISO/TS 16949 certification. The Cuyahoga Falls plant received ISO 14001 environmental certification in 2014.

In December 2014, LTL Color Compounders was purchased. This precolor compound maker was merged with Americhem Infinity to form Infinity LTL Engineered Compounds. In March 2016, Americhem acquired Vi-Chem Corporation of Grand Rapids, MI, a producer of PVC and elastomeric compounds, specializing in "soft touch" technology for the automotive industry.

Americhem products 

Americhem manufactures color and additive masterbatches (also known as color and additive concentrates) for use in the plastics and synthetic fibers industries. Most of the company’s products are made for specific customers and specific applications. In addition, Americhem makes single pigment dispersions, which are used by customers as a stand-alone product or to mix to create their own colors.

Additives can be included with the color concentrates, including but not limited to antioxidants, UV stabilizers, flame retardants, slip and antistatic agents, optical brighteners, antimicrobials and nucleating agents. These additives can also be made as stand-alone products, with or without color.

Infinity LTL, manufactures and sells engineering grade, custom compounded precolored polymer composites to meet the demands of specific customer applications. The company specializes in a wide range of engineered polymers with no minimum order size and provides a high level of technical support and a flexible customer focused style. The company also offers a wide array of reinforcements, fillers and lubricants that enhance the base resin properties for many engineering resins.

Vi-Chem Corporation is a manufacturer of custom thermoplastic compounds and polymeric alloys, delivering value-added compounded products for injection molders, blow molders and extrusion operations. Vi-Chem maintains the ISO/TS 16949 automotive manufacturing standard as well as the ISO/IEC 17025 testing laboratory certification.

Services 
Analytical and Physical Testing
Weathering Testing
Quality Testing
Continuing Education
Custom Product Design
Research and Development
Pilot Lines and Process Simulations
Color Design
Color Trends

Locations 

 Cuyahoga Falls, Ohio – Americhem World Headquarters
 Concord, North Carolina
 Liberty, North Carolina
 Mansfield, Texas
 Dalton, Georgia
 Manchester, United Kingdom
 Suzhou, China
 Swedesboro, New Jersey
 Morrisville, Pennsylvania
 Grand Rapids, Michigan

References 

Companies based in Akron, Ohio
Chemical companies established in 1941
1941 establishments in Ohio
Privately held companies based in Ohio